Elaine Stritch (February 2, 1925 – July 17, 2014) was an American actress, known for her work on Broadway and later, television. She made her professional stage debut in 1944 and appeared in numerous stage plays, musicals, feature films and television series. Stritch was inducted into the American Theater Hall of Fame in 1995.

Stritch made her Broadway debut in the 1946 comedy Loco and went on to receive four Tony Award nominations: for the William Inge play Bus Stop (1956); the  Noël Coward musical Sail Away (1962); the Stephen Sondheim musical Company (1970), which included her performance of the song "The Ladies Who Lunch"; and for the revival of the Edward Albee play A Delicate Balance (1996). Her one-woman show Elaine Stritch at Liberty won the 2002 Tony Award for Best Special Theatrical Event.

Stritch relocated to London in the 1970s and starred in several West End productions, including Tennessee Williams' Small Craft Warnings (1973) and Neil Simon's The Gingerbread Lady (1974). She also starred with Donald Sinden in the ITV sitcom Two's Company (1975–79), which earned her a 1979 BAFTA TV Award nomination. She won an Emmy Award in 1993 for her guest role on Law & Order and another for the 2004 television documentary of her one-woman show Elaine Stritch at Liberty. From 2007 to 2012, she had a recurring role as Colleen Donaghy on the NBC sitcom 30 Rock, a role that won her a third Emmy in 2007.

Early life
Stritch was born on February 2, 1925, in Detroit, Michigan, the youngest daughter of Mildred (née Jobe; 1893–1987), a homemaker, and George Joseph Stritch (1892–1987), an executive with B.F. Goodrich. She had two older sisters, Georgene and Sally. Her Catholic family was well-off. Her father was of Irish descent, while her mother had Welsh ancestry. Cardinal Samuel Stritch, Archbishop of Chicago from 1940 to 1958, was one of her cousins. She trained at the Dramatic Workshop of The New School in New York City under Erwin Piscator, alongside Marlon Brando and Bea Arthur.

Career

Early stage career
Stritch made her stage debut in 1944. However, her Broadway debut was in Loco in 1946, directed by Jed Harris, followed soon after by Made in Heaven (as a replacement)  and then Angel in the Wings (1947), a revue in which she performed comedy sketches and the song "Civilization".

Stritch understudied Ethel Merman for Call Me Madam, and, at the same time, appeared in the 1952 revival of Pal Joey, singing "Zip". Stritch later starred in the national tour of Call Me Madam, and appeared in a supporting role in the original Broadway production of William Inge's play Bus Stop. In 1958 she originated the leading role of Maggie Harris in the musical Goldilocks.

She starred in Noël Coward's Sail Away on Broadway in 1961. Stritch started in the show in a "relatively minor role and was only promoted over the title and given virtually all the best songs when it was reckoned that the leading lady...although excellent, was rather too operatic for a musical comedy". During out-of-town tryouts in Boston, Coward was "unsure about the dramatic talents" of one of the leads, opera singer Jean Fenn.

Joe Layton suggested "What would happen if...we just eliminated [Fenn's] role and gave everything to Stritch?  The show was very old-fashioned, and the thing that was working was Elaine Stritch.  Every time she went on stage [she] was a sensation." The reconstructed 'Sail Away' opened on Broadway at the Broadhurst Theatre on October 3, 1961", with Stritch giving what Howard Taubman of The New York Times said "must be the performance of her career."

In 1966, she played Ruth Sherwood in the musical Wonderful Town at New York's City Center, and appeared in an Off Broadway revival of Private Lives in 1968.

She was the original performer cast in the role of Joanne in Stephen Sondheim's Company (1970) on Broadway. After over a decade of successful runs in shows in New York, Stritch moved in 1972 to London, where she starred in the West End production of Company. On tour and in stock, Stritch appeared in such musicals as No, No, Nanette, The King and I, I Married an Angel, and in Mame as both Vera Charles (opposite Janet Blair) and Mame Dennis.

Television
Strich's earliest television appearances were in The Growing Paynes (1949) and the Goodyear Television Playhouse (1953–55). She also appeared on episodes of The Ed Sullivan Show in 1954. She was the first and original Trixie Norton in a Honeymooners sketch with Jackie Gleason, Art Carney and Pert Kelton. The character was originally a burlesque dancer, but the role was rewritten and recast after just one episode with the more wholesome looking Joyce Randolph playing the character as a housewife.

Stritch's other television credits included a number of dramatic programs in the 1950s and 1960s, including Studio One. In the 1960 television season, Stritch appeared in the role of writer Ruth Sherwood in the CBS sitcom My Sister Eileen, opposite Shirley Bonne as her younger sister, Eileen Sherwood, an aspiring actress. The sisters, natives of Ohio, live in a brownstone apartment in Greenwich Village. The one-season series aired opposite Hawaiian Eye on ABC and Perry Como's Kraft Music Hall on NBC.  She gave a moving performance on Wagon Train as the title character in "The Tracy Sadler Story".  The episode first aired on 3/8/1960, and centered on the wrongly convicted "Tracy's" search for her long lost son, after serving a 12 year prison sentence. Stritch's performance was a convincing combination of brittle vulnerability and near self-sacrifice, due to her unconditional love for her son.

In 1975, Stritch starred in the British LWT comedy series Two's Company opposite Donald Sinden. She played Dorothy McNab, an American writer living in London who was known for her lurid and sensationalist thriller novels. Sinden played Robert, her English butler, who disapproved of practically everything Dorothy did and the series derived its comedy from the inevitable culture clash between Robert's very British stiff-upper-lip attitude and Dorothy's devil-may-care New York view of life. Two's Company was exceptionally well received in Britain and ran for four series until 1979. In 1979, both Stritch and Sinden were nominated for a BAFTA TV Award for Two's Company, in the category "Best Light Entertainment Performance", losing out to Ronnie Barker. 

In 1980, Stritch starred in another series for LWT, Nobody's Perfect (the British version of Maude—not to be confused with the 1980 American series of the same name, which aired in the UK as Hart of the Yard) playing Bill Hooper alongside Richard Griffiths as her husband Sam. Unsatisfied with the Anglicised scripts, Stritch herself adapted the original American scripts for all but one of the fourteen episodes (Griffiths handled the remaining one).

Other British television appearances by Strich included Roald Dahl's Tales of the Unexpected. Although she appeared several times in different roles, perhaps her most memorable appearance was in the story "William and Mary", in which she played the wife of a man who has cheated death by having his brain preserved. She appeared on BBC 1's children's series, Jackanory, reading, among other stories, Charlie and the Chocolate Factory by Roald Dahl.

After returning to the United States, she appeared on The Edge of Night as vinegary nanny Mrs. DeGroot, then was cast as a regular on the short-lived The Ellen Burstyn Show in 1986. She appeared as the stern schoolteacher Mrs. McGee on three episodes of The Cosby Show (1989–90). She had a recurring role in Law & Order (1992, 1997) as Lanie Stieglitz. Other roles included Judge Grace Lema on Oz (1998); and Martha Albright (mother of Jane Curtin's character) on two episodes of 3rd Rock From the Sun (1997, 2001), alongside her Broadway co-star George Grizzard, who played George Albright. On April 26, 2007, she began guest appearances on the NBC sitcom 30 Rock as Colleen, the fearsome mother of Alec Baldwin's lead character, Jack Donaghy.

Stritch was reportedly considered for the role of Dorothy Zbornak on The Golden Girls but, as she related in her show Elaine Stritch at Liberty, she "blew her audition". The role was cast with Beatrice Arthur. She was seen on One Life to Live (1993), replacing fellow stage legend Eileen Heckart as Wilma Bern. In 1996, she appeared on an episode of Late Show with David Letterman as a woman who believes host David Letterman is her pool boy.

Film roles
Stritch appeared in more films in her later years than the early part of her career. In an interview in 1988, it was noted that "Making movies is challenging to Stritch since she considers herself a novice." She said: "I'm fascinated with it. And I want to do more of them." She was asked why she waited so long to make movies since she apparently enjoys it so much. "You do a movie for, like, three months and then you're finished. You do a part in a play and it's like going into a roomful of audiences for a year."

Early in her career, she appeared in Three Violent People (1956) starring Charlton Heston, as the hotel proprietor pal of Anne Baxter, and then co-starred opposite Rock Hudson and Jennifer Jones in the David O. Selznick remake of A Farewell to Arms (1957) as Hudson's nurse. In The Perfect Furlough, she co-starred opposite Tony Curtis and Janet Leigh. She had a showy role as the lesbian proprietor of a bar in the cult film Who Killed Teddy Bear? (1965), which starred Sal Mineo. She played a "tough-as-nails" nurse in the remake of The Spiral Staircase (1975) and was praised for her performance in Providence (1977).

When she returned to the United States in the mid-1980s from London, Woody Allen cast her as the former movie star mother in his drama September (1987). People magazine called her performance "acclaimed" and wrote "Though the movie has received mixed reviews, Stritch's roaring presence, like Godzilla in a stalled elevator, can't be ignored." Allen later cast her in his comedy Small Time Crooks (2000) in which she played a "snobby socialite". Rex Reed wrote of her performance: "Elaine Stritch can still stop you in your tracks with a meaningless, drop-dead one-liner (which is all she gets here)."

She joined the ensemble of Cocoon: The Return (1988) as an apartment manager who helps widowed Jack Gilford get over his wife's death. Among her co-stars were former Goldilocks co-star Don Ameche and Gwen Verdon. She appeared in Out to Sea (1997) as Dyan Cannon's wise-cracking mother and "danced up a storm" with the other characters.  She played Winona Ryder's loving grandmother in the film Autumn in New York (2000).

Stritch had a rare co-starring role in the comedy Screwed (2000), playing Miss Crock, who becomes the intended victim of a kidnapping by her disgruntled butler (Norm Macdonald). She appeared in the comedy Monster in Law (2005) starring Jennifer Lopez and Jane Fonda, playing Fonda's mother-in-law.

BBC Radio
In 1982, Stritch appeared on an edition of the long-running BBC Radio comedy series Just a Minute alongside Kenneth Williams, Clement Freud and Barry Cryer. The show was described by long-time chairman Nicholas Parsons as being among the most memorable because of the way Stritch stretched the show's rules. She described Kenneth Williams as capable of making "one word into a three-act play".

Later stage work
After her husband, John Bay, died from brain cancer in 1982, Stritch returned to America, and after a further lull in her career and struggles with alcoholism, Stritch began performing again. She appeared in a one-night only concert of Company in 1993 and as Parthy in a Broadway revival of the musical Show Boat in 1994.

In 1996 she played Claire in a revival of Edward Albee's A Delicate Balance, with Variety writing: "Equally marvelous is Stritch, with a meatier role than her recent foray as Parthy in 'Show Boat.' To watch her succumb to the vast amounts of alcohol Claire ingests, folding and refolding her legs, slipping – no, oozing – onto the floor, her face crumpling like a paper bag, is to witness a different but equally winning kind of thespian expertise. It's a master class up there."

Elaine Stritch at Liberty

Her one-woman show Elaine Stritch at Liberty, a summation of her life and career, premiered at New York's Public Theater, running from November 7 to December 30, 2001. It then ran on Broadway at the Neil Simon Theatre from February 21 to May 27, 2002, and then, also in 2002, at London's Old Vic Theatre. 
Newsweek noted:

A Little Night Music
Stritch appeared in the Broadway revival of the Sondheim-Wheeler musical A Little Night Music from July 2010 to January 2011, succeeding Angela Lansbury in the role of Madame Armfeldt, the mother who remembers her life as a courtesan in the song "Liaisons". The AP reviewer of the musical (with the two new leads) wrote "Devotees of Stritch, who earned her Sondheim stripes singing, memorably, 'The Ladies Who Lunch' in Company 40 years ago, will revel in how the actress, who earned a huge ovation before her very first line at a recent preview, brings her famously salty, acerbic style to the role of Madame Armfeldt."

The theatre critic for The Toronto Star wrote:

Cabaret
Stritch performed a cabaret act in New York City at the Cafe Carlyle in the Carlyle Hotel, where she was a resident from 2005 until she left New York in 2013. Her first show at the Carlyle was titled "At Home at the Carlyle". The New York Times reviewer wrote:

Between musical numbers, Stritch told stories from the world of stage and screen, tales from her everyday life and personal glimpses of her private tragedies and triumphs. She performed at the Cafe Carlyle in early 2010 and in fall 2011 in At Home at the Carlyle: Elaine Stritch Singin' Sondheim...One Song at a Time.

Personal life
Strich was married to the actor John Bay from 1973 until his death in 1982. He was part of the family that owns the Bay's English Muffins company, and Stritch sent English muffins as gifts to friends. Said John Kenley: "Every Christmas, she still sends me English muffins." When she was based in London, Stritch and her husband lived at the Savoy Hotel.

She was good friends with gossip columnist Liz Smith, with whom she shared a birthday (February 2).

In March 2013, Stritch announced she was leaving New York and relocating to Birmingham, Michigan, close to where she grew up.

Stritch was candid about her alcoholism. She took her first drink at 14 and began using it as a crutch before performances to vanquish her stage fright and insecurities. Her drinking worsened after Bay's death, and she sought help after experiencing problems with the effects of alcoholism, including the onset of diabetes. Elaine Stritch at Liberty discusses the topic at length.

Death
Stritch died in her sleep at the age of 89 at her home in Birmingham, Michigan, on July 17, 2014. She suffered from diabetes and had stomach cancer. At the time of her death, only three months after having had surgery for the disease, cancer was not cited as an immediate cause of her death. Her body was buried at Memorial Park Cemetery, Cook County, Illinois.

Acting credits

Theatre 
Sources: FilmReference.com; Internet Broadway Database; TCM

 Bobino (1944) (The New School)
 The Private Life of the Master Race (1945) (City College of New York)
 Woman Bites Dog (1946) (Philadelphia)
 What Every Woman Knows (1946) (Westport Country Playhouse)
 Loco (1946) (Broadway)
 Made in Heaven (1947) (Broadway) (replacement for Jane Middleton)
 Angel in the Wings (1947) (Broadway)
 The Shape of Things (1947) (East Hampton, New York)
 The Little Foxes (1947) (Off-Broadway)
 Three Indelicate Ladies (1947) (New Haven, Connecticut)
 Texas Li'l Darling (1949) (Westport Country Playhouse)
 Yes, M'Lord (1949) (Broadway)
 Call Me Madam (1950) (Broadway standby for Ethel Merman and as the leading lady on the US National Tour)
 Anything Goes (1950) (Lambertville, New Jersey)
 Pal Joey (1952) (Broadway)
 Once Married, Twice Shy (1953) (Westport Country Playhouse)
 Panama Hattie (1954) (Louisville, Kentucky)
 Call Me Madam (1954) (The Muny)
 On Your Toes (1954) (Broadway)
 Bus Stop (1955) (Broadway)
 The Sin of Pat Muldoon (1957) (Broadway)
 Goldilocks (1958) (Broadway)
 Sail Away (1961) (Broadway and London)
 The Time of the Barracudas (1963) (closed on the road)
 Who's Afraid of Virginia Woolf? (1963) (Broadway) (replacement for Uta Hagen)
 I Married an Angel (1964) (US regional tour)
 Who's Afraid of Virginia Woolf? (1965) (US national tour)
 The King and I (1965) (US regional tour)
 The Grass Harp (1966) (Providence, Rhode Island)
 Wonderful Town (1967) (New York City Center)
 Any Wednesday (1967) (US national tour)
 Private Lives (1968) (Off-Broadway)
 Mame (1968) (US national tour)
 Mame (1969) (US regional tour)
 Company (1970) (Broadway, US national tour and London)
 Small Craft Warnings (1973) (London)
 The Gingerbread Lady (1974) (London)
 Suite in Two Keys (1982) (Paper Mill Playhouse)
 Dancing in the End Zone (1984) (Coconut Grove, Florida)
 Follies In Concert (1985) (Lincoln Center)
 Happy Birthday, Mr. Abbott! or Night of 100 Years (1987) (Broadway) (benefit concert)
 Broadway at the Bowl (1988) (Hollywood Bowl)
 Love Letters  (1990) (Broadway) (replacement for Kate Nelligan)
 The Rodgers & Hart Revue (1991) (New York City)
 Cakewalk by Peter Feibleman (1993) (American Repertory Theater)
 Company (1993) (Terrace Theater and Vivian Beaumont Theater)
 Show Boat (1993) (Toronto and Broadway)
 A Delicate Balance (1996) (Broadway)
 Angela Lansbury – A Celebration (1996) (Broadway) (benefit concert)
 Sail Away (1999) In Concert (Carnegie Hall)
 Elaine Stritch at Liberty (2002) (Broadway, London, US national tour, and UK tour)
 Endgame (2008) (Brooklyn Academy of Music) as "Nell"
 The Full Monty (2009) (Paper Mill Playhouse)
 A Little Night Music (2010) (Broadway) (replacement for Angela Lansbury)

Filmography
The Scarlet Hour (1956) - Phyllis Rycker
Three Violent People (1956) - Ruby LaSalle
A Farewell to Arms (1957) - Helen Ferguson
The Perfect Furlough (1958) - Liz Baker
Kiss Her Goodbye (1959) - Marge Carson
Who Killed Teddy Bear (1965) - Marian Freeman
Too Many Thieves (1966) - Miss G
The Sidelong Glances of a Pigeon Kicker (1970) - Tough Lady
Original Cast Album: Company (1970, Documentary) - Herself (Joanne)
Pollyanna (1973, TV Mini-Series, BBC) - Aunt Polly
The Spiral Staircase (1975) - Nurse Baker
Providence (1977) - Helen Wiener
September (1987) - Diane
Cocoon: The Return (1988) - Ruby Feinberg
Cadillac Man (1990) - Widow
Out to Sea (1997) - Mavis LaBreche
Krippendorf's Tribe (1998) - Irene Hargrove
Screwed (2000) - Virginia Crock
Small Time Crooks (2000) - Chi Chi Potter
Autumn in New York (2000) - Dolores "Dolly" Talbot
Broadway: The Golden Age, by the Legends Who Were There (2003, Documentary) - Herself
Elaine Stritch at Liberty (2004, Documentary) - Herself
The Needs of Kim Stanley (2005, Documentary) - Herself
Monster-in-Law (2005) - Gertrude Fields
Romance & Cigarettes (2005) - Grace Murder
ParaNorman (2012) - Grandma Babcock (voice)
Elaine Stritch: Shoot Me (2013, Documentary) - Herself
River of Fundament (2014) - Eulogist
Randy Cunningham: 9th Grade Ninja (2014) - Ruth (voice)
Broadway: Beyond the Golden Age (2018, Documentary) - Herself

Television

 Wagon Train (1960, guest star)
 Two's Company (1975 - 1979) - Dorothy McNab
 30 Rock (2007 - 2012) - Colleen Donaghy

Awards and honors 

The Tony Award for Best Special Theatrical Event was awarded to the producers of Elaine Stritch at Liberty. However, Stritch enthusiastically accepted the award at the 56th Tony Awards, later complaining that her acceptance speech was cut off by the strains of the orchestra, which left her feeling angry.

The Primetime Emmy Award for Outstanding Variety, Music, or Comedy Special for The HBO special of Elaine Stritch at Liberty, was awarded to its producers.

Stritch was inducted into the American Theater Hall of Fame in 1995.

In popular culture
Stritch's voice and vocal delivery are spoofed in the Forbidden Broadway songs "The Ladies Who Screech" and "Stritch", parodies of "The Ladies Who Lunch" and "Zip", songs she performed in the musicals Company and Pal Joey.

In 2009, a parody by Bats Langley entitled "How the Stritch Stole Christmas" (loosely based on "How the Grinch Stole Christmas") appeared on YouTube.

On The Big Gay Sketch Show in 2007, she was spoofed (portrayed by Nicol Paone) as a Wal-Mart greeter who is still a theater gal at heart. In a later episode, Stritch is spoofed as an airport security guard, who's still "on" and isn't able to tone down her over-the-top antics. In yet another episode, "Stritch" is promoting her self-titled perfume "Stritchy" in dramatic fashion when she is confronted by the real-life Elaine Stritch, who makes a cameo appearance.

References

External links

Elaine Stritch papers, 1925-2012 (bulk 1943-2011), held by the Billy Rose Theatre Division, New York Public Library for the Performing Arts

Father Beck interviews Elaine Stritch
The night Elton John told Elaine Stritch, "This is 'Your Song'"— and she kept it

1925 births
2014 deaths
20th-century American actresses
21st-century American actresses
Actresses from Detroit
People from Birmingham, Michigan
American women singers
American film actresses
American musical theatre actresses
American people of Irish descent
American people of Welsh descent
Schools of the Sacred Heart alumni
Catholics from Michigan
Catholics from New York (state)
American stage actresses
American television actresses
Drama Desk Award winners
Nightlife in New York City
Primetime Emmy Award winners
Singers from Detroit